Be Your Own Best Friend was Ray Stevens' sixteenth studio album as well as his fourth and final for Warner Bros. Records, released in 1978. The third track, "You've Got the Music Inside," is a re-recording of a track that was from Stevens' 1973 album Nashville.

All of the selections were published by Ray Stevens Music-BMI, with the exception of "You've Got the Music Inside," which was published by Ahab Music Company, Inc.-BMI.

The title track is the album's sole single.

Track listing

Personnel
Ray Stevens - keyboards, synthesizer, percussion
Jerry Kroon - drums
Jack Williams - bass
Chet Atkins, Steve Gibson - electric guitar
Mark Casstevens - acoustic guitar
Lisa Silver, Sheri Kramer, Diane Tidwell - backing vocals
Shelly Kurland Strings - strings
Ray Stevens, Denis Solee - horns
Technical
Stuart Keathley - recording engineer
Charlie Tallent, Ray Stevens - mixing
Ray Stevens - production, arrangements
Recorded at Ray Stevens' Studio - Nashville
Ed Thrasher - photography
Brad Kanawyer - design

Charts
Singles - Billboard (North America)

1978 albums
Ray Stevens albums
Warner Records albums